Bagalkot Assembly constituency is one of the 224 constituencies in the Karnataka Legislative Assembly, in India. It is also part of Bagalkot (Lok Sabha constituency).

Assembly Members

Bombay State
 1951: Muranal Basappa Tammanna, Indian National Congress

Mysore State
 1957: Muranal Basappa Tammanna, Indian National Congress
 1962: Muranal Basappa Tammanna, Indian National Congress
1962 (By-Poll): S. Nijalingappa, Indian National Congress
 1967: Muranal Basappa Tammanna, Indian National Congress
 1972: Muranal Basappa Tammanna, Indian National Congress

Karnataka State
 1978: Kalligudda Parappa Karabasappa, Indian National Congress (Indira)
 1983: Mantur Gulappa Venkappa, Independent
 1985: Mantur Gulappa Venkappa, Janata Party
 1989: Ajaykumar Sambasadashiva Sarnaik, Janata Dal
 1994: Ajaykumar Sambasadashiva Sarnaik, Janata Dal
 1998 (By-Poll): Pujari Pralhad Hanamantappa, Bharatiya Janata Party
 1999: Pujari Pralhad Hanamantappa, Bharatiya Janata Party
 2004: Veerabhadrayya (Veeranna) Charantimath, Bharatiya Janata Party
 2008: Veerabhadrayya (Veeranna) Charantimath, Bharatiya Janata Party
 2013: Hullappa Yamanappa Meti, Indian National Congress

Election results

1972 Assembly Election
 Muranal Basappa Tammanna (INC) : 29,638 votes  
 N. P. Mallanagouda (NCO) :	23688

2013 Assembly Election
 Meti, Hullappa Yamanappa (INC) : 68,216 votes  
 Charantimath Veeranna Chandrashekharayya (BJP) : 65316

2018 Assembly Election
 Veerabhadrayya Charantimath (BJP) : 85,653 votes	
 Meti Hullappa Yamanappa		INC	69719

See also
 List of constituencies of Karnataka Legislative Assembly

References

Assembly constituencies of Karnataka